The Sportsground, also known as The Galway Sportsgrounds and the Galway Greyhound Stadium and the Connacht Rugby Stadium is a multi-purpose stadium in Galway, Ireland. It opened in 1927, with the playing of a football match and has been used to host Connacht Rugby matches and greyhound racing since that time.

It is used as a base by Connacht Rugby for training and hosting matches at all levels. Greyhound racing takes place on Friday and Saturday evenings.

The stadium has been leased on a long term basis to the Greyhound Racing Ireland who run the greyhound meetings at the Stadium. It is co-leased to Connacht Rugby who use it as their home stadium to play rugby union matches in the Pro14 and European competitions.

Rugby Union

Up until 2011, the regular capacity of The Sportsground was 5,500. The stadium was modified and extended in 2011, and again in 2016, instigated by the success of Connacht Rugby. The facilities include the:

 Main Stand – which has enclosed corporate facilities and covered terrace underneath
 Clan Terrace – a covered terrace on the clubhouse side of the ground
 Covered Stand – a covered seated stand to the side of the main stand which holds 300 people
 Uncovered terracing – at the Bohermore and College Road ends of the ground

The Sportsground is able to hold up to 8,129 people without temporary seating. It recorded its record attendance on 19 November 2011, when a crowd of 9,120 watched Connacht take on Toulouse in the team's first ever Heineken Cup match at home.

Renovations since 2011
Connacht's participation in European rugby's most prestigious club competition, the Heineken Cup, for the first time in the 2011–12 season spurred a new phase of development at the Sportsground to extend formal capacity to 7,500 supporters. The existing Clubhouse Terrace was knocked down to be replaced by the new covered "Clan Terrace". This terrace primarily houses season ticket holders. Ancillary work was also undertaken behind the terrace which saw the construction of a new bar (The Clan Bar), food outlets and restroom facilities on the clubhouse side of the ground. A temporary covered and seated "West Stand", adjacent to the existing main stand was also erected for the season. This series of improvements came on the back of developments which the IRFU had helped to fund in the preceding years, such as a new playing surface, a new clubhouse and floodlighting, while a new gymnasium had been built in 2008.

In 2011, planning permission was granted to redevelop the Clan Terrace by building a seated tier above the terrace. This was ultimately not completed.

In the summer of 2016, work was completed on an additional seated and covered stand which can hold 300 people. The stand, situated next to the Main Stand, increased the ground's regular capacity to 8,100. Following a naming rights deal, it was christened as the Grant Thornton Stand.

In October 2018, Connacht unveiled plans for a €30m redevelopment of the Sportsground to turn it into a 12,000 seater stadium with the redevelopment to also include a high-performance training centre.

International rugby

Other sports
The venue has occasionally hosted Gaelic games fixtures, including the 1932 All-Ireland Senior Camogie Championship Final and the 1942 Galway County Hurling Final.

When Terryland Park was being renovated in 1993, Galway United played at the Sportsgrounds for the first part of that season. It also hosted Galway's first game in European competition in the 1985–86 European Cup Winners' Cup.

Greyhound racing
Racing takes place every Friday and Saturday evening. Distances are 350, 525, 550, and 575 yards. The feature competition at the track is the Champion Bitch Stake. Ollie Hester has been Racing Manager since 2003. Previous managers were Tom Moran, Luke Colleran, Tom Holland, Ned Shea and Martin Divilly. Eugene Kelly was the first Racing Manager in 1932.

History
The Galway Greyhound Company was established in 1929 but it took a further three years for the first greyhound racing to take place at the west coast venue on the west side of the Lough Atalia. The opening night was during 1932.

By 1978 the stadium required a facelift and the management decided that improvements could only be completed with the closure of the greyhound track. Therefore, in 1978 a new stand with bars and tote facilities was built and the circuit itself was re-laid with increased cambers. The grand re-opening was on 25 May 1979 with the modernisation costing over £500,000. In March 1998 the track was converted to sand from grass. In 2003 the track was subject to a major renovation project that cost the Bord na gCon €6m.

As of the early 21st century, Connacht Rugby expressed a desire to redevelop the ground and have been in negotiation with the Greyhound Racing Ireland who hold a 99-year lease.

Track records
Current

Former

See also

 Connacht Rugby

References

Buildings and structures in Galway (city)
Connacht Rugby
Multi-purpose stadiums in the Republic of Ireland
Rugby union stadiums in Ireland
Sport in Galway (city)
Sports venues in County Galway
Rugby union in County Galway
Greyhound racing venues in the Republic of Ireland